Arthur Broomhall (born 1860; date of death unknown) was an English footballer who played for Burslem Port Vale and Stoke.

Career
Broomhall played for Burslem Port Vale before joining Stoke for the 1886–87 season where he played in one match in the FA Cup. He conceded six goals as Stoke lost a second qualifying round match 6–4 against Crewe Alexandra.

After leaving Stoke he re-joined local Combination side Burslem Port Vale in summer 1888, playing twenty games, most of them friendlies, before being released in 1890.

Career statistics
Source:

References

Footballers from Stoke-on-Trent
Association football goalkeepers
English footballers
Stoke City F.C. players
Port Vale F.C. players
1860 births
Year of death missing